The Yura or Thura-Yura languages are a group of Australian Aboriginal languages surrounding Spencer Gulf and Gulf St Vincent in South Australia, that comprise a genetic language family of the Pama–Nyungan family.

Name
The name Yura comes from the word for "person" in the northern languages; this is a lenited form of the thura found in other languages, hence Thura-Yura. Similar words for "person" are found in languages outside the group, however (for example 'yura' - 'person' in the Sydney language).

Languages
The following classification is proposed by Bowern & Koch (2004):
Nangga: Wirangu, Nauo
Core Thura-Yura
Yura (northern): Adnyamathanha–Kuyani, Barngarla
Kadli (southern): Narangga, Kaurna
(unclassified) Nukunu, Ngadjuri

A Nukunu speaker reported that the Nukunu could understand Barngarla and Kuyani, but not more distant varieties.

Peramangk may have been a southern Thura-Yura language, close to Kaurna.

Dixon (2002) lists a Nantuwara language, but there is no data for it.

Proto-language

Reconstructed Thura-Yura vocabulary by Simpson and Hercus (2004):

Spelling conventions
alveolar tap: r
alveolar trill: rr
retroflex glide: ṟ
retroflex tap: rd
indeterminate rhotic: R

References

 
Indigenous Australian languages in South Australia